The 14th parallel north is a circle of latitude that is 14 degrees north of the Earth's equatorial plane. It crosses Africa, Asia, the Indian Ocean, the Pacific Ocean, Central America, the Caribbean and the Atlantic Ocean.

At this latitude the sun is visible for 12 hours, 57 minutes during the summer solstice and 11 hours, 18 minutes during the winter solstice.

Around the world
Starting at the Prime Meridian and heading eastwards, the parallel 14° north passes through:

{| class="wikitable plainrowheaders"
! scope="col" width="125" | Co-ordinates
! scope="col" | Country, territory or sea
! scope="col" | Notes
|-
| 
! scope="row" | 
|
|-
| 
! scope="row" | 
| The border with Chad is in Lake Chad
|-
| 
! scope="row" | 
|
|-
| 
! scope="row" | 
|
|-
| 
! scope="row" | 
|
|-
| 
! scope="row" | 
| 
|-
| style="background:#b0e0e6;" | 
! scope="row" style="background:#b0e0e6;" | Red Sea
| style="background:#b0e0e6;" |
|-
| 
! scope="row" | 
| Zuqar Island
|-
| style="background:#b0e0e6;" | 
! scope="row" style="background:#b0e0e6;" | Red Sea
| style="background:#b0e0e6;" |
|-
| 
! scope="row" | 
|
|-
| style="background:#b0e0e6;" | 
! scope="row" style="background:#b0e0e6;" | Indian Ocean
| style="background:#b0e0e6;" | Arabian Sea
|-
| 
! scope="row" | 
|
|-
| style="background:#b0e0e6;" | 
! scope="row" style="background:#b0e0e6;" | Indian Ocean
| style="background:#b0e0e6;" | Arabian Sea
|-valign="top"
| 
! scope="row" | 
| Karnataka Andhra Pradesh Karnataka - for about 3 km Andhra Pradesh
|-
| style="background:#b0e0e6;" | 
! scope="row" style="background:#b0e0e6;" | Indian Ocean
| style="background:#b0e0e6;" | Bay of Bengal
|-
| 
! scope="row" |  (Burma)
| Little Coco Island
|-
| style="background:#b0e0e6;" | 
! scope="row" style="background:#b0e0e6;" | Indian Ocean
| style="background:#b0e0e6;" | Andaman Sea - passing just south of Great Coco Island, 
|-
| 
! scope="row" |  (Burma)
|
|-
| 
! scope="row" | 
| Passing just north of Rangsit near Bangkok
|-
| 
! scope="row" | 
|
|-
| 
! scope="row" | 
|
|-
| 
! scope="row" | 
|
|-
| 
! scope="row" | 
|
|-
| style="background:#b0e0e6;" | 
! scope="row" style="background:#b0e0e6;" | South China Sea
| style="background:#b0e0e6;" | Passing just north of Lubang Island, 
|-valign="top"
| 
! scope="row" | 
| Island of Luzon - passing through Taal Lake, and Taal Volcano on an island in the lake
|-
| style="background:#b0e0e6;" | 
! scope="row" style="background:#b0e0e6;" | Lamon Bay
| style="background:#b0e0e6;" | Passing by the southernmost tip of Alabat Island, 
|-
| 
! scope="row" | 
| Island of Luzon
|-
| style="background:#b0e0e6;" | 
! scope="row" style="background:#b0e0e6;" | San Miguel Bay
| style="background:#b0e0e6;" |
|-
| 
! scope="row" | 
| Island of Luzon
|-
| style="background:#b0e0e6;" | 
! scope="row" style="background:#b0e0e6;" | Pacific Ocean
| style="background:#b0e0e6;" | Philippine Sea
|-
| 
! scope="row" | 
| Island of Catanduanes
|-valign="top"
| style="background:#b0e0e6;" | 
! scope="row" style="background:#b0e0e6;" | Pacific Ocean
| style="background:#b0e0e6;" | Philippine Sea passing just south of Rota,  and into an unnamed part of the ocean
|-
| 
! scope="row" | 
|
|-
| 
! scope="row" | 
|
|-
| 
! scope="row" | 
| Passing just south of Tegucigalpa
|-
| 
! scope="row" | 
|
|-
| 
! scope="row" | 
|
|-
| 
! scope="row" | 
|
|-
| style="background:#b0e0e6;" | 
! scope="row" style="background:#b0e0e6;" | Caribbean Sea
| style="background:#b0e0e6;" |
|-
| 
! scope="row" | 
| Passing just south of Castries
|-
| style="background:#b0e0e6;" | 
! scope="row" style="background:#b0e0e6;" | Atlantic Ocean
| style="background:#b0e0e6;" |
|-
| 
! scope="row" | 
|
|-valign="top"
| 
! scope="row" | 
|
|-
| 
! scope="row" | 
|
|}

See also
13th parallel north
15th parallel north

References

n14